Townscaper is an indie city builder video game. It was released for PC and Mac on the Steam platform in August 2021 by developer Oskar Stålberg. A port to the Nintendo Switch was released in August 2021, alongside which the Steam version left early access. The mobile version was released in October 2021. It was later ported to Xbox One, Xbox Series X/S, and web browsers (as a demo) in December 2021. It features low poly graphics and a simple, minimalist user interface.

Gameplay
Townscaper has no inherent objective or story and has been described by developer Stålberg as "more of a toy" than a game. Users construct an island town by placing and removing colored blocks on an ocean. Various "rules" dictate these blocks' appearances, with some appearing as spires and others as balconies. This method of rule-based decoration allows arches, gardens, and stairways to be created without specific user instruction.

Setting
Townscaper takes place on a large distorted grid set in an infinite sea. This allows for towns that feel more organic and unstructured when compared to similar games that are based on regular grids.

Development
Townscaper was developed by Swedish developer Oskar Stålberg, who previously worked on Bad North. Stålberg gave a talk at the IndieCade Europe 2019 event during development, showcasing some of the game's features, including terrain generation and procedural building design.

Reception

The PC edition of Townscaper received a critic score of 86% according to review aggregator Metacritic, indicating generally favorable reviews. The Nintendo Switch edition received a score of 63%, indicating a mixed or average reception.

Natalie Clayton of PC Gamer wrote: "Townscaper may not have the complexity of a Cities: Skylines, but its quaint towns littered with cobbled streets and old churches, dockyards and lighthouses feel more instantly homely than the sterile American-styled metropolises of "real" city-builders."

Christian Donlan of Eurogamer wrote: "...but met on its own terms, diving in when you've a few spare minutes to lay down a new neighbourhood, Townscaper is an absolutely joyous little time waster that's kept me busy since it first hit early access last year (opens in new tab). Now that it's out for real, I don't doubt it'll keep popping back in for a quick vacation for many months to come."

Tilly Lawton of Pocket Tactics wrote: "Townscaper serves up a gorgeous, illustrative art style, serene sound design, and a simple concept that’s sure to put you at ease."

See also 

 Islanders, a minimalist city-builder released in 2019

References

External links
 

2021 video games
Browser games
City-building games
Early access video games
Indie video games
MacOS games
Nintendo Switch games
Non-games
Raw Fury games
Video games developed in Sweden
Windows games
Xbox One games
Xbox Series X and Series S games